Presidencia Roque Sáenz Peña (normally known as Sáenz Peña) is a city in the . It is the second largest in the province. The city has a population of 76,377 for the urban area (localidad) and 88,164 for the whole municipality.

Sáenz Peña was founded in 1912 and has developed as a commercial and industrial centre serving the surrounding agricultural region of the Gran Chaco plains.

Climate

See also

National University of the Chaco Austral

References

 

Populated places in Chaco Province
Cities in Argentina
Argentina